The 1985 European Cup was the 10th edition of the European Cup of athletics.

The "A" Finals were held in Moscow, Soviet Union. The first two teams qualified for the 1985 IAAF World Cup.

"A" Final
Held on 17 and 18 August in Moscow, Soviet Union

Teams standings

Results summary

Men's events

Women's events

"B" Final
Both "B" finals held on 10 and 11 August in Budapest, Hungary

"C" Finals
All "C" finals held on 10 and 11 August

Men

"C1" Final
Held in Schwechat, Austria

"C2" Final
Held in Reykjavík, Iceland

Women

"C1" Final
Held in Schwechat, Austria

"C2" Final
Held in Reykjavík, Iceland

References

External links
European Cup results (Men) from GBR Athletics
European Cup results (Women) from GBR Athletics

European Cup (athletics)
European Cup
European Cup
European Cup
International athletics competitions hosted by the Soviet Union